A list of animated television series first aired in 1980.

See also
 List of animated feature films of 1980
 List of Japanese animation television series of 1980

References

Television series
Animated series
1980
1980
1980-related lists